Aspiring Adventures is a small-group adventure travel company with operations in South America (specifically, Peru, Ecuador, and Patagonia), New Zealand, Australia, Myanmar and Vanuatu.

The travel company was formed specifically for travelers interested in hiking, biking, kayaking and other outdoor activities, along with a focus on unique cultural events, local food and locally owned accommodations.

History
Established by Steve Wilson (from New Zealand) and Katy Shorthouse (from Australia), who started working together in the adventure travel industry in 2005, Aspiring Adventures was created out of the desire to operate individualized itineraries which included visiting unique cultural events, such as the Inti Raymi festival in Peru, and the Naghol Land diving ceremony of Pentecost Island, Vanuatu.

The company head office is located in Dunedin, New Zealand, and has satellite offices in Cusco, Peru and Melbourne, Australia.

In 2009, Aspiring Adventures created their first Mountain biking trips in Peru pioneering biking on the Inca Trails.

In 2010, material for the 7th edition of a Peru guidebook published by Lonely Planet was authored by Katy Shorthouse. In 2014, Aspiring Adventures was selected as having one of the world's 50 Best Guided Expeditions by National Geographic Traveler magazine, the only New Zealand travel business to be recognised in the list. In 2014 and 2015, Aspiring Adventures was awarded a Certificate of Excellence by Trip Advisor. 

In 2015, Aspiring Adventures was selected by National Geographic Traveler magazine as having one of the best tours in Central and South America, this time for its Quyllur Rit'i tour, an active cultural adventure tour which incorporates a pilgrimage to a Peruvian festival of the same name. In 2016, for the third consecutive year, Aspiring Adventures was awarded a Trip Advisor Certificate of Excellence. 

In May 2018, the travel company was inducted into the Trip Advisor Hall of Fame (for being awarded its Certificate of Excellence for five or more consecutive years).

References

External links 
 Aspiring Adventures homepage

Travel and holiday companies of New Zealand
Adventure travel